Esteban Néstor Conde Quintana (born 4 March 1983) is a Uruguayan football manager and former player who plays as a goalkeeper. He is the current manager of Danubio.

Conde is supporter of Nacional; going to the games of that club at Estadio Parque Central, when he played at Danubio and had free time.

Club career

Danubio
Conde began his career with Rentistas in 2003, where he achieved the promotion to Uruguayan top level division. After playing his first season in the elite division, he was transferred to Uruguayan giants Danubio, in where Esteban earned the 2006–07 Primera División title and scored six goals all via penalty kick, being a key player in the scheme of Gustavo Matosas, the coach of the club.

Thanks to the league title achieved, he made 2008 Copa Libertadores group stage debut against Lanús in Buenos Aires, conceding three goals in a 3–1 away defeat, receiving the same season a call–up of Óscar Tabárez to the Uruguay national team prior to a qualifier match for the 2010 FIFA World Cup match against Peru.

Universidad de Chile
On 23 December 2009, Conde signed a four–year contract with Chilean Primera División powerhouse club Universidad de Chile, conscious of that he will be Miguel Pinto's back–up, before of the appointment of the coach Gerardo Pelusso. He made his official debut in a 5–1 win over Cobresal in Coquimbo for the league tournament, making his club's international debut against Caracas for the Copa Libertadores, in where with a goal of his compatriot Juan Manuel Olivera, his club won the match 1–0. On 8 April 2012, he played his most important game in the club in a 2–2 away draw for the international contest against Flamengo at Rio de Janeiro. After of his very well performance at Brazil, he failed to play against Colo-Colo for the Chilean football derby, because the keeper Miguel Pinto, the Chilean national team's player, was fully recovered of his long–time injury, relegating him to the bench. However, Pelusso selected to Esteban as the Copa Chile first choice keeper, playing two games against Lota Schwager at Coronel and Santiago.

After of the departure of Pinto to Mexican club Atlas, the club's corporation Azul Azul, informed that Conde will be the first keeper for the 2011 season, despite of the arrival of Nery Veloso and also of Carlos Alfaro, who would be the back–up keepers of Conde. However, on 24 January, Jhonny Herrera returned to the club after five years, playing at Audax Italiano the last season, in where achieved the recognition of be Chilean Primera División's best keeper of the season. Despite of Herrera's return, the things for Esteban were somewhat favorable, because Unión San Felipe signed to Nery Veloso and the third–choice keeper Carlos Alfaro made a poor South American Youth Championship at Peru under the coach César Vaccia. That left to the charrua as the second–choice keeper for the season. His first game in the season was recently on 30 June for the first week of the Torneo de Clausura, playing in a 3–0 home win over Deportes La Serena, failing to play in the Torneo de Apertura, because Jorge Sampaoli, not considered him during the season.

On 28 June 2012, through an interview with El Gráfico, he declared that his opportunities are over after Gerardo Pelusso's departure in late 2010, then with the arrival of Jorge Sampaoli and of the keeper Jhonny Herrera, saying also that he won't continue at the club. After of Universidad de Chile's success at the Torneo de Apertura, the Azul Azul corporation reported that Raúl Ruidíaz and he will be free agents.

Atlético de Rafaela
On 30 July 2012, was reported that he joined on loan to Primera División Argentina club Atlético de Rafaela.

Later career
Conde joined Nacional in 2015, and was a regular starter before returning to Argentina in 2019, with Banfield. In August 2020, he returned to his home country after signing for Atenas in Segunda División.

In 2021, Conde returned to his former club Danubio. A regular starter, he helped in their promotion back to the top tier before retiring in 2022, aged 39.

International career
Conde  made his senior debut in a friendly 3-1 loss to the Republic of Ireland on 4 June 2017.

Managerial career
Immediately after retiring, Conde was named manager of Danubio for the 2023 season on 14 November 2022, replacing Jorge Fossati.

Career statistics

Club

Honours

Club
Danubio
 Uruguayan Primera División (1): 2006–07

Universidad de Chile
Primera División de Chile (2): 2011 Apertura, 2011–C
Copa Sudamericana (1): 2011

References

External links

 
 
 

1983 births
Living people
Uruguayan footballers
Uruguay international footballers
Uruguayan expatriate footballers
Association football goalkeepers
Club Nacional de Football players
C.A. Rentistas players
Danubio F.C. players
Universidad de Chile footballers
Atlético de Rafaela footballers
Club Atlético Banfield footballers
Atenas de San Carlos players
Uruguayan Primera División players
Uruguayan Segunda División players
Chilean Primera División players
Argentine Primera División players
Uruguayan expatriate sportspeople in Chile
Uruguayan expatriate sportspeople in Argentina
Expatriate footballers in Chile
Expatriate footballers in Argentina
Uruguayan football managers
Danubio F.C. managers